Slivnica Površ is a small village in the municipality of Ravno, Bosnia and Herzegovina. As of 1991, it had a population of 21 people.

Demographics 
According to the 2013 census, its population was 2, both Serbs.

References

Populated places in Ravno, Bosnia and Herzegovina